Oroklini-Troulloi FC 2020 is a Cypriot football club which is based in the village of Troulloi in Larnaca district. The club was founded in 1952 as Digenis Oroklinis. In the 2014–2015 season the team competed in the Cypriot Second Division for the first time in its history.

History
Digenis was founded in 1952 under the name Athletic Club Omonia Oroklinis. In 1983 the general meeting of the association decided to rename to Digenis. The club's emblem contained the date 1983 when the name changed. The team's colours are white, blue and green.

Oroklini-Troulloi FC 2020 was founded in June 2020 by the consolidation of Digenis Oroklinis and the Troulloi FC 2015 team, which had been formed three years earlier by a merger of Sourouklis Troullon and Dafni Troulloi. The new team moved from Oroklini to Troulloi.

The club has many appearances in the Third and Fourth Division.

Current squad

For recent transfers, see List of Cypriot football transfers summer 2018.

League history
The following table shows the progress of the team in time (for those seasons found data).

Honours
 Cypriot Fourth Division: 2
2007–08, 2011–12

 Cypriot Cup for lower divisions:
Runner-up: (1) 2008–09

References

External links
Official Site
Soccerway Profile

Football clubs in Cyprus
Association football clubs established in 1983
1983 establishments in Cyprus
Football clubs in Larnaca
Digenis Oroklinis